Opposition to the government of President Vladimir Putin in Russia can be divided between the parliamentary opposition parties in the State Duma and the various non-systemic opposition organizations. While the former are largely viewed as being more or less loyal to the government and Putin, the latter oppose the government and are mostly unrepresented in government bodies. 

The "systemic opposition" is mainly composed by the Communist Party of the Russian Federation (KPRF), the Liberal Democratic Party of Russia (LDPR), A Just Russia — For Truth (SRZP), New People and other minor parties; these political groups, while theoretically claiming to be in opposition, generally support the government's policies.

Major political parties considered to be part of the non-systemic opposition include Yabloko and the People's Freedom Party (PARNAS), along with the unregistered party Russia of the Future and Libertarian Party of Russia (LPR). Other notable opposition groups included the Russian Opposition Coordination Council (KSO) (2012–13) and The Other Russia (2006–11), as well as various non-governmental organizations (NGOs).

Their supporters vary in political ideology, ranging from liberals and socialists to nationalists. They are mainly unified by their opposition to President Putin and corruption in the government. However, a lack of unity within the opposition has also hindered its standing. Opposition figures also claim that a number of laws have been passed and other measures taken by President Putin's government to prevent them from having any electoral success.

Background and white-ribbon opposition

The Guardians report from Luke Harding noted that during the 2000s Neo-Nazis, Russian nationalists, and ultranationalist groups were the most significant opposition to Putin's government.

Since 2012, for the protesters for fair elections the term white ribbon opposition has been applied, as they wore white ribbons as their symbol.

Some observers noted what they described as a "generational struggle" among Russians over perception of Putin's rule, with younger Russians more likely to be against Putin and his policies and older Russians more likely to accept the narrative presented by state-controlled media in Russia. Putin's approval rating among young Russians was 32% in January 2019. Putin's support among Russians aged 18–24 was 20% in December 2020.

Actions and campaigns
Current campaigns of the opposition:Dissemination of anti-Putin reports''': Putin. Results. 10 years (2010), Putin. Corruption (2011), Life of a Slave on Galleys (2012). Video versions of these reports, entitled Lies of Putin's regime, have been viewed by about 10 million times on the Internet.

In addition, smaller-scale series of actions are conducted. For example, in Moscow in the spring of 2012 saw a series of flash mobs "White Square", when protesters walked through the Red Square with white ribbons, in the late spring and summer, they organized the protest camp "Occupy Abay" and autumn they held weekly "Liberty walks" with the chains symbolizing solidarity with political prisoners.

A Monstration is a parody demonstration where participants gently poke fun at Kremlin policies.

Participation in elections
Some opposition figures, for example, chess grandmaster Garry Kasparov, said there are no elections in Putin's Russia, and that participation in a procedure called elections only legitimizes the regime.

On the other hand, a small part of liberals (the party of "Democratic Choice") consider elections as the main tool to achieve their political goals.

History

2006–2008 Dissenters' March

The Dissenters' March was a series of Russian opposition protests started in 2006. It was preceded by opposition rallies in Russian cities in December 2005 which involved fewer people. Most of the Dissenters' March protests were unsanctioned by authorities. The Dissenters' March rally was organized by The Other Russia, a broad umbrella group that includes opposition leaders, including National Bolshevik Party with its leader Eduard Limonov, far-left Vanguard of Red Youth as well as liberals such as former world chess champion and United Civil Front leader Garry Kasparov.

2009–2011 Strategy-31

Strategy-31 was a series of civic protests in support of the right to peaceful assembly in Russia guaranteed by Article 31 of the Russian Constitution. Since 31 July 2009, the protests were held in Moscow on Triumfalnaya Square on the 31st of every month with 31 days. Strategy-31 was led by writer Eduard Limonov and human rights activist Lyudmila Alexeyeva.

2011–2013 Russian protests

Starting from 5 December 2011, the day after the elections to the State Duma, there have been repeated massive political actions of Russian citizens who disagree with the outcome of these "elections". The current surge of mass opposition rallies has been called in some publications "a snow revolution". These rallies continued during the campaign for the election of the President of Russia and after 4 March 2012, presidential election, in which Putin officially won the first round. The protesters claimed that the elections were accompanied by violations of the election legislation and widespread fraud. One of the main slogans of the majority of actions was "For Fair Elections!" and a white ribbon has been chosen as symbol of protests. Beginning from spring 2012 the actions were called marches of millions and took the form of a march followed by a rally. The speeches of participants were anti-Putin and anti-government.

The "March of Millions" on 6 May 2012 at the approach to Bolotnaya Square was dispersed by the police. In the Bolotnaya Square case 17 people are accused of committing violence against police (12 of them are in jail). A large number of human rights defenders and community leaders have declared the detainees innocent and the police responsible for the clashes.

For the rally on 15 December 2012, the anniversary of the mass protests against rigged elections, the organizers failed to agree with the authorities, and participation was low. Several thousand people gathered without placards on Lubyanka Square and laid flowers at the Solovetsky Stone.

2014 anti-war protests

In 2014, members of the Russian opposition have held anti-war protests in opposition to the Russian military intervention in Ukraine in the aftermath of the 2014 Ukrainian revolution and Crimean crisis. The March of Peace protests took place in Moscow on 15 March, a day before the Crimean status referendum. The protests have been the largest in Russia since the 2011 protests. Reuters reported that 30,000 people participated in 15 March anti-war rally.

2017–2018 Russian protests

On 26 March 2017, protests against alleged corruption in the Russian government took place simultaneously in many cities across the country. The protests began after the release of the film He Is Not Dimon to You by Alexei Navalny's Anti-Corruption Foundation. An April 2017 Levada poll found that 45% of surveyed Russians supported the resignation of Russian Prime Minister Dmitry Medvedev, against it 33% of respondents. Newsweek reported that "An opinion poll by the Moscow-based Levada Center indicated that 38 percent of Russians supported the rallies and that 67 percent held Putin personally responsible for high-level corruption."

A May 2017 Levada poll found that 58% of surveyed Russians supported the protests, while 23% said they disapprove.

2018 Russian pension protests

From July 2018, almost every weekend, protest rallies and demonstrations were organized against the planned retirement age hike. Such events occurred in nearly all major cities countrywide including Novosibirsk, St.-Petersburg and Moscow. These events were coordinated by all opposition parties with the leading role of the communists. Also trade unions and some individual politicians (among whom Navalny) functioned as organizers of the public actions.

An intention to hike the retirement age has drastically downed the rating of the President Vladimir Putin and Prime Minister Dmitry Medvedev in Russia. So in July 2018, just 49% would vote for Putin if the presidential elections were held in that moment (while during the elections in March 2018, he got 76.7%).

2019 Russian protests

In the first half of 2019 there were approximately 863 protests across the country.

From July 2019, protest rallies for an access to 2019 Moscow City Duma election of independent candidates started in Moscow. The 20 July rally was the largest since 2012. The 27 July rally set a record in number of detainees and police violence. The 10 August rally outnumbered the 27 July rally, oppositional sources report 50-60 thousand participants.

2020–21 Khabarovsk Krai protests

On 9 July 2020, the popular governor of the Khabarovsk Krai, Sergei Furgal, who defeated the candidate of Putin's United Russia party in elections two years ago, was arrested and flown to Moscow. Furgal was arrested 15 years after the alleged crimes he is accused of. Every day since 11 June, mass protests have been held in the Khabarovsk Krai in support of Furgal. On 25 July, tens of thousands of people were estimated to have taken part in the third major rally in Khabarovsk. The protests included chants of "Away with Putin!", "This is our region", "Furgal was our choice" or "shame on LDPR" and "Shame on the Kremlin!"

In a Levada Center poll carried out from 24 to 25 July 2020, 45% of surveyed Russians viewed the protests positively, 26% neutrally and 17% negatively.

2021 Russian protests

On 23 January 2021, protests across Russia were held in support of the Russian opposition leader Alexei Navalny, who was detained and then jailed after returning to Russia on 17 January following his poisoning. A few days before the protests, an investigation by Navalny and his Anti-Corruption Foundation was published, accusing Putin of corruption. The video garnered 70 million views in a few days.

Since jailing of Navalny a "hardening of the course" was observed from the government side, with a choice of "go West or East" being offered to prominent opposition figures, meaning a non-negotiable alternative of either going on emigration ("West") or to prison colonies ("East"). Among those who left Russia are politicians Lyubov Sobol, Dmitry Gudkov, Ivan Zhdanov (whose father had been however arrested in Russia as a hostage), Kira Yarmysh, journalists Andrei Soldatov, Irina Borogan, Roman Badanin. The wave of repressions has been also linked with the September 2021 Duma elections.

2021 Russian election protests

Protests against alleged large-scale fraud in favour of the ruling party were held.

2022 anti-war protests

Following the 2022 Russian invasion of Ukraine, protesters have used the white-blue-white flag as a symbol of opposition though not all used the flag. Several opposition activists (such as Maria Motuznaya) had criticized the justification by AssezJeune (one of the creators of the flag) to remove the red stripe.

On the afternoon of the Russian invasion of Ukraine, the Investigative Committee of Russia issued a warning to Russians that they would face legal repercussions for joining unsanctioned protests related to "the tense foreign political situation". The protests have been met with widespread repression by the Russian authorities. According to OVD-Info, at least 14,906 people were detained from 24 February to 13 March, including the largest single-day mass arrests in post-Soviet Russian history on 6 March.

In February 2022, more than 30,000 technology workers, 6,000 medical workers, 3,400 architects, more than 4,300 teachers, more than 17,000 artists, 5,000 scientists, and 2,000 actors, directors, and other creative figures signed open letters calling for Putin's government to stop the war. Some Russians who signed petitions against Russia's war in Ukraine lost their jobs.

On 17 March, Putin gave a speech in which he called opponents of the war "scum and traitors," saying that a "natural and necessary self-cleansing of society will only strengthen our country." Russian authorities were encouraging Russians to report their friends, colleagues and family members to the police for expressing opposition to the war in Ukraine.

More than 2,000 people were detained or fined by May 2022 under the laws prohibiting "fake" information about the military. In July 2022, Alexei Gorinov, a member of the Krasnoselsky district council in Moscow, was sentenced to seven years in prison after making anti-war comments at a council meeting in March. Lawyer Pavel Chikov said that this was the first jail term under the new Russian 2022 war censorship laws.

Symbols
The white-blue-white flag is a symbol of opposition to the 2022 Russian invasion of Ukraine that has been used by Russian anti-war protesters. It has also been used as a symbol of opposition to the current government of Russia.

In culture
Books12 Who Don't Agree (2009), non-fiction book by Valery PanyushkinWinter is Coming (2015), non-fiction book by former Russian chess grandmaster Garry Kasparov

FilmsLes Enfants terribles de Vladimir Vladimirovitch Poutine (2006)This is Our City (2007), by Alexander ShcherbanosovThe Revolution That Wasn't (2008), by Alyona Polunina (2018), by Putin's Palace: History of the World's Largest Bribe'' (2021), by Alexei Navalny
Navalny (2022), by Daniel Roher

See also
Assassination of Boris Nemtsov
Belarusian opposition
Dissenters' March
Non-system opposition
Reaction of Russian intelligentsia to the 2014 annexation of Crimea
Russia under Vladimir Putin
"Russia will be free"
Kirill Serebrennikov
Democracy movements of China
Political groups under Vladimir Putin's presidency
National Endowment for Democracy

Notes

References

External links

List of political prisoners in Russia (Russian) in 2015, compiled by "New Chronicle of Current Events".

Politics of Russia
Anti-imperialism